Château Élysée is a 1920's replica of a 17th-century French-Normandy chateau in Hollywood, California. Owned by the Church of Scientology, it is the home of Celebrity Centre International and the Manor Hotel. It is located at 5930 Franklin Avenue in the Franklin Village section of Los Angeles, California.

History

In 1927, Elinor "Nell" Ince, commissioned architect Arthur E. Harvey and contractor Luther T. Mayo, Inc. to build a luxury long-term residential apartment house for movie stars and the film industry.

Ince sold the property in 1943, and in 1951 the home was converted into a luxury retirement home called Fifield Manor. By the 1970's, the building was slated for demolition, and was purchased by the Church of Scientology.

On September 23, 1987, the City of Los Angeles declared the building as a Los Angeles Historic-Cultural Monument, number 329, encompassing the addresses 5925-5939 Yucca Street, 5930-5936 Franklin Avenue, and 1806-1830 Tamarind Avenue.

Church of Scientology

In 1969, the building began being used by the Church of Scientology for its Celebrity Centre International, and they purchased the building in 1973 for one million dollars. In the 1990's, the buildings and grounds were renovated, and by 2013 the value of the property was estimated at $75 million.

The Manor Hotel operates on several of the floors and the rest of the building is the Celebrity Centre. Guided tours are available to the general public.

The Renaissance Restaurant, located in the conservatory, has described itself as an "Award-winning five-star restaurant serving fresh organic and preservative-free French-Californian cuisine." The restaurant  was previously open to the public, but it is now only open to Scientologists, their guests, and occasional visitors.

References

Buildings and structures in Hollywood, Los Angeles
Châteauesque architecture in the United States
Scientology properties
Los Angeles Historic-Cultural Monuments
Hotel buildings completed in 1927